Illia Yuriyovych Kovtun (born 10 August 2003) is a Ukrainian artistic gymnast who competed at the 2020 Olympic Games.  He is the 2021 World and European all-around bronze medalist, and is a two-time junior world championships medalist.

Gymnastics career

Junior

2018 
Kovtun competed at the 2018 European Championships where he helped Ukraine finish fifth in the team finals.  Individually he won the junior title on the parallel bars.

2019 
Kovtun competed at the Stella Zakharova Cup where he placed first in the junior all-around division.  He was selected to represent Ukraine at the inaugural junior World Championships alongside Nazar Chepurnyi and Volodymyr Kostiuk.  Together they finished second as a team behind Japan.  Individually he won the bronze medal in the all-around behind Shinnosuke Oka and Ryosuke Doi.  During event finals Kovtun finished sixth on pommel horse and fourth on parallel bars.

Kovtun next competed at the European Youth Olympic Festival in Baku, Azerbaijan, again alongside Chepurnyi and Kostiuk.  They won gold as a team and individually Kovtun won gold in the all-around and on parallel bars and horizontal bar; additionally he won silver on floor exercise behind Chepurnyi.

2020 
Kovtun competed at the  2020 European Championships held in Mersin, Turkey.  While there he led the Ukrainian junior team to gold.  Individually he won gold in the all-around and on pommel horse, rings, and parallel bars. He also won the silver medal in the junior vault event.

Senior

2021 
Kovtun turned senior in 2021 and made his senior international debut at the 2021 European Championships.  He won the bronze medal in the all-around competition behind Nikita Nagornyy and David Belyavskiy.  Kovtun next competed at the World Challenge Cups in Varna and Cairo; he picked up five gold medals and two bronze medals.

Due to the postponement of the 2020 Summer Olympics, Kovtun was age-eligible to compete at them in 2021.  He was named to represent Ukraine alongside Petro Pakhnyuk, Igor Radivilov, and Yevhen Yudenkov.  They qualified to the team final and individually Kovtun qualified to the all-around final.  During the team final Kovtun competed on floor exercise, pommel horse, parallel bars, and high bar, contributing towards Ukraine's seventh-place finish.  During the all-around final Kovtun finished 11th.

After the Olympic Games Kovtun returned to competition at the World Challenge Cups in Koper and Mersin where he picked up an additional gold and bronze medal and three silvers.  He ended up winning the series titles on floor exercise, pommel horse, and parallel bars.

In October Kovtun competed at the 2021 World Championships where he won the all-around bronze medal behind Zhang Boheng and Hashimoto Daiki.  Additionally he placed seventh on horizontal bar.  He next competed at the Arthur Gander Memorial where he placed third behind Yul Moldauer and Nikita Nagornyy.  Kovtun then competed at the Swiss Cup where he was partnered with Yelyzaveta Hubareva; they finished second behind the Russian team of Nagornyy and Angelina Melnikova.

In December Kovtun was awarded with the title Merited Master of Sports of Ukraine.

2022 
Kovtun competed at the Cottbus World Cup in February.  On the first day of qualifications Russia launched a full-scale invasion of Kovtun's home country of Ukraine.  Despite news of the ongoing war, Kovtun won gold on parallel bars and silver on pommel horse and finished fourth and fifth on floor exercise and horizontal bar respectively.  Kovtun next competed at the Doha World Cup where he qualified to all six apparatus event finals.  On the first day of event finals he won silver on floor exercise behind Artem Dolgopyat and placed fifth and sixth on pommel horse and rings respectively.  On the second day of event finals he won gold on parallel bars and bronze on horizontal bar behind Alexander Myakinin and Robert Tvorogal and placed sixth on vault.  During the medal ceremony for the parallel bars Russian gymnast and bronze medalist Ivan Kuliak wore a Z on his chest – a military symbol and a sign of support for Russia's invasion of Ukraine – despite sharing a podium with Kovtun, a Ukrainian athlete, and Kazakh gymnast and silver medalist Milad Karimi who lives and trains in Ukraine.  At the Cairo World Cup Kovtun won his third consecutive gold medal on the parallel bars.  Kovtun finished the World Cup circuit competing at the Baku World Cup. He won his fourth consecutive gold medal on the parallel bars, completing a clean sweep of the titles.  Additionally he won the bronze on horizontal bar.

Due to the ongoing war, Kovtun did not return to Ukraine. His team was given shelter by gymnastics clubs in European countries where they could train in exile and prepare for future competitions. For the first couple of days, the refugees were hosted by Blau-Weiss Buchholz, a German club, before they spent the next two months in the Palestra Ginnastica Ferrara in Italy. From their temporary training places the team participated in national and international competitions. Kovtun competed several times for the Monaco gymnastics club in the French league. In the middle of June 2022, the group of about 15 people including coaches and few family members moved to a gym in Croatia.

In August Kovtun competed at the European Championships.  On the first day of competition he finished eleventh in the all-around and helped Ukraine finish ninth as a team during qualifications.  Although they didn't qualify for the team final they qualified a whole team to compete at the upcoming World Championships.  Individually Kovtun qualified for the floor exercise and parallel bars finals.  During the floor exercise final Kovtun finished fifth.  During the parallel bars final Kovtun recorded the highest score, a 15.333, but lost a tie-break to Joe Fraser of the United Kingdom and took home the silver medal.  At the Szombathely Challenge Cup Kovtun earned gold on both floor exercise and parallel bars.

In late October through early November Kovtun competed at the World Championships.  While there he qualified to the all-around final and was the first reserve for the parallel bars final.  He finished seventh in the all-around.  He next competed at the Arthur Gander Memorial where he placed first in the four-event all-around despite a rough start on floor exercise.

2023 
Kovtun competed at the World Cups in Cottbus, Doha, and Baku.  He won gold on parallel bars in Cottbus and Doha and silver in Baku behind Carlos Yulo.  Additionally he won silver on floor exercise behind Milad Karimi in Baku.

Competitive history

Eponymous skills
Kovtun has one skill named after him on parallel bars.

References

External links 

 

Living people
2003 births
Sportspeople from Cherkasy
Ukrainian male artistic gymnasts
Medalists at the World Artistic Gymnastics Championships
Medalists at the Junior World Artistic Gymnastics Championships
Gymnasts at the 2020 Summer Olympics
Olympic gymnasts of Ukraine
21st-century Ukrainian people